Vasilis Dimitriadis (born 1 February 1966) is a Greek former professional footballer who played as a striker.

Club career
Dimitriadis started his professional career at Aris in 1986. In 1991 Dimitriadis changed the yellow shirt of Aris for the yellow-black of AEK Athens by signing a 2-year contract, on a transfer that cost over 100 million drachmas. The team from Thessaloniki got about 95 million and the income of two friendly matches between the two teams, in one which Dimitriadis scored. Dimitriadis was also a target of PAOK with their then president, Thomas Voulinos, had offered 105 million plus the goalkeeper Gitsioudis, but the bad relations between the two teams of Thessaloniki and the quick moves of Kostas Generakis did not allow that move to happen.

Dimitriadis played a total of 5.5 years with the AEK , celebrating 3 championships, 1 cup and 1 super cup. He became the top scorer for two consecutive years, in 1992 (28 goals), 1993 (33 goals) and in the second he even won the European Silver shoe, after scoring one goal less than the first Ally McCoist of Rangers. In the summer of 1993 his contract expired when his career was at its peak but the proposals did not manage to come after Dimitriadis agreed with Dimitris Melissanidis within 5 minutes to renew his contract. However, from this point on his career at AEK was starting to decline. In the 1993-94 season he scored 11 goals and was almost permanently the first player to sub out. In the 1994-95 season, all of AEK had moved to mediocrity, but the additions of Saravakos, Ketsbaia and Kostis made things difficult, with Dimitriadis scoring 8 goals in the league. In 1995-96 all his participations were as a substitution, usually entering the last 10 minutes to rest the attackers. In the summer of 1996, AEK acquired Demis Nikolaidis from Apollon Athens in which Dimitriadis was said to be one the exchanges for the move. Dimitriadis, confused, asked to leave the team, but the president of AEK, Trochanas stated that everything was a misunderstanding.

However, Dimitriadis had decided not to stay at AEK and after six months he returned to Aris and although he managed to score 8 goals, his team was relegated and eventually he ended his career.

International career
Dimitriadis earned 28 caps for the Greece and competed at the 1994 FIFA World Cup which he played twice.

After football
After the end of his career, he was at times the general manager of AEK, a position he had held for the last time from the summer of 2013 until March 2022.

Honours

AEK Athens
Alpha Ethniki: 1991–92, 1992–93, 1993–94
Greek Cup: 1995–96
Greek Super Cup: 1996

Individual
Alpha Ethniki top scorer: 1991–92, 1992–93
Greek Cup top scorer: 1992–93
European Silver Shoe: 1992–93

References

1966 births
Living people
Association football forwards
Greek footballers
Greece international footballers
Super League Greece players
Aris Thessaloniki F.C. players
AEK Athens F.C. players
1994 FIFA World Cup players
AEK F.C. non-playing staff
Footballers from Thessaloniki